Aubrey Basil Boomer (1 November 1897 – 2 October 1989) was a professional golfer who played in the early 20th century. Boomer had three top-10 finishes in the Open Championship. He was a frequent competitor in the French Open and won the event five times.

Early life
Boomer was born on 1 November 1897 and grew up in Jersey. His father George was a school teacher in Grouville and had, in 1902, designed the La Moye Golf Club. Aubrey's brother Percy (1885–1949) was also a professional golfer.

Golf career

Ryder Cup
Boomer played in the first two Ryder Cup matches. In the 1927 Ryder Cup contested at Worcester Country Club in Massachusetts the British team was defeated 9½–2½. At his death he was the last surviving member of the 1927 British team, although he was out-lived by Gene Sarazen.

French Open
Boomer won the French Open five times—in 1921, 1922, 1926, 1929, and 1931. In the 1921 French Open, Boomer won in a playoff against Arnaud Massy, his former golf teacher. Massy picked up his ball on the 34th hole after being 8 shots behind after 33 holes. Massy had been 3 shots up after 9 holes.  In his 1929 victory he beat the St Cloud course record with a score of 61. Horton Smith was second with Gene Sarazen third.

In the 1922 French Open he beat the La Boulie course record, scoring 65 in the third round. Boomer won by 9 strokes from Eugène Lafitte, setting a record score for any national championship.

Belgian Open
Boomer twice finished second in the Belgian Open, in 1920 and 1924. In the 1924 tournament he came second on 146. Walter Hagen won with a score of 143. In 1926, one of his best years, he finally broke through and won the event.

1924 Open Championship
The 1924 Open Championship was held 26–27 June at Royal Liverpool Golf Club in Hoylake, England. Walter Hagen won the second of his four Open Championships, one stroke ahead of runner-up Ernest Whitcombe. Boomer finished tied for sixth place in the event.

1927 Open Championship
The 1927 Open Championship was held 13–15 July at the Old Course at St Andrews in St Andrews, Scotland. Amateur Bobby Jones successfully defended the title with a six-stroke victory, the second of his three victories at the Open Championship. Boomer and Fred Robson tied for second place, six shots back.

Death
He suffered a stroke in Cannes and died later in Brussels on 2 October 1989.

Tournament wins (19)
 1921 Open de France
 1922 Open de France, Belgian Open
 1923 Letchworth Tournament
 1924 Dutch Open
 1925 Dutch Open, Roehampton Tournament
 1926 Dutch Open, Open de France, Belgian Open, Daily Mail Tournament, Glasgow Herald Tournament
 1927 Dutch Open, South Open (Argentina)
 1928 Grand Prix PGA France
 1929 Open de France
 1931 Open de France
 1932 Italian Open
 1938 Grand Prix PGA France

Results in major championships

Note: Boomer never played in the Masters Tournament nor the PGA Championship.

CUT = missed the half-way cut
"T" indicates a tie for a place

Team appearances
Great Britain vs USA (representing Great Britain): 1926 (winners)
Ryder Cup (representing Great Britain): 1927, 1929 (winners)
France–Great Britain Professional Match (representing Great Britain): 1929 (winners)

References

Jersey male golfers
Ryder Cup competitors for Europe
People from Grouville
1897 births
1989 deaths